Diamond Rugs is an American band project, composed of John McCauley and keyboardist Robbie Crowell of Deer Tick, Ian Saint Pé of The Black Lips, Hardy Morris of Dead Confederate, Steve Berlin of Los Lobos, and Bryan Dufresne of Six Finger Satellite. Their eponymous album, Diamond Rugs, was released on April 24, 2012, and second album, Cosmetics, on February 24, 2015.

Members 
Current
Steve Berlin – piano, keyboard, horns (2010–present)
Robbie Crowell – bass, piano, keyboard, saxophone (2010–present)
Bryan Dufresne – drums (2010–present)
John McCauley – vocals, guitar (2010–present)
Hardy Morris – vocals, guitar (2010–present)
Ian Saint Pé – vocals, guitar (2010–present)

Discography 

Albums
 Diamond Rugs (2012)
 Cosmetics (2015)

Singles

References

External links 
Official Website

American alternative rock groups
Partisan Records artists